Lian/Lien (連/连), (廉) is a Chinese surname.

Origin

連
The Chinese Lian (連) family originated from the Gaoxin (高辛) family,  Lianao (連敖) of Chu (state), and the Jiang (姜) family of Qi (state). Also, it was founded from various public offices of the Zhou Dynasty period and the public offices of the Han Dynasty period. Later, another Lian (連) family was founded from the Xiongnu people, the Xianbei people, and the Manchu people.

廉
The Chinese Lian (廉) family originated from the Xiong family of the Chu (state) and the Uyghur people. It is also said that the Lian family descended from the Yellow Emperor. It is the 66th name on the Hundred Family Surnames poem.

Notable people

練
 Denis Lian (練建勝 born 1972), Singaporean race car driver

連
 Lian Heng (連橫, 1878–1936), Chinese historian, father of Lien Chen-tung
Lien Chen-tung, (連震東, 1904 - 1986) former Republic of China Minister of the Interior, father of Lien Chan 
 Lien Chan, former Vice President of the Republic of China (Taiwan)
 Sarah Lian (born 1983), Malaysian Chinese actress
 Shiga Lin (born 1988), Hong Kong singer and actress

廉
 Lian Po (廉頗, 3rd century BC), Chinese general

Unknown
 Daniel Lian, Singaporean economist

References

Multiple Chinese surnames